The Huanglongtan Dam is a concrete gravity dam located on the Du River, a tributary of the Han River. The main purpose of the dam is hydroelectric power generation but it also provides for flood control. It was constructed between 1969 and 1976 and support a 510 MW power station.

Background
The Huanglongtan Dam and two other projects on the river (Songshuling and Pankou Dams) were surveyed in 1954 and final designs were prepared in 1964. Construction on Huanglongtan, the first of the projects to be implemented, began in April 1969. The original 85 MW generators were commissioned in 1974 and the dam was complete in 1976. The entire project was accepted by the state in 1978. The flood inundated the power station as the dam was not prepared for the inflow. This was due to mis-communication within the basin and a lack of a proper hydrological forecast system. In May 2003 the dam's power plant underwent an expansion which included the installation of two new 170 MW Francis turbines along with a new power house and water delivery system. The first of the two generators was operational at the end of 2004 and the project complete in 2005.

Design
The dam's original power station is located just downstream on the left bank of the river and contains 2 x 85 MW Francis turbine-generators.

See also

 Pankou Dam – located upstream
List of dams and reservoirs in China
List of major power stations in Hubei

References

Dams in China
Hydroelectric power stations in Hubei
Gravity dams
Dams completed in 1976
Energy infrastructure completed in 1974